Georgian Gorge is a village at an altitude of 60 meters from sea level, at Olginski riverside in the Gagra District of Abkhazia, Georgia. Distance to Gagra is 7 km.

See also
 Gagra District

Notes

Literature 
 Georgian Soviet Encyclopedia, V. 9, p. 189, Tb., 1985.

References

Populated places in Gagra District